Banbar County, is a county of the Chamdo Prefecture in the Tibet Autonomous Region,

The seat is the town of Banbar Town.

Villages

Coka
Domartang

 
Counties of Tibet
Chamdo